Serhat Güller (born 18 December 1968) is a Turkish football manager and a former player.

Player career
Serhat Güller started his professional player career in İnegölspor in 1987. In 1989, he received the attention of Galatasaray. However, he can be mostly named together with Ankaragücü where he played 5 seasons during which he was capped 9 times to national team.

League appearances
Season, team, appearances, goals, yellow cards, red cards. İncludes only domestic matches.
(1987–89)  İnegölspor
(1989–90) Galatasaray
(1990–95) MKE Ankaragücü 138(6), yel:24, red:1 (He was loaned in 1990-91 season)
(1995–96) Karşıyaka 30(2+1 o.g), yel:3, red:1
(1996–98) KDÇ Karabükspor 66(1), yel: 12, red:1
(1998-00) Yimpaş Yozgatspor 48(1), yel: 9, red:0
(2000–01) Hatayspor 11(0), yel:3, red:0

total goal: 10, own goal: 2, total yel: 51, total red: 3

National team appearances
He appeared in national team in Sepp Piontek period, against Norway in April 1993 when the team lost the game 3-1; in 0-0 ended San Marino game; and, 0-1 lost Germany game (friendly game). Under Piontek's management the national team was not successful, but after that period could catch a take-off. Among his teammates were Hakan Şükür, Bülent Korkmaz, Aykut Kocaman, and Ünal Karaman and many other famous players of the time.

National team (A): 9 (1992–93);
Olympic national team: 4 (1991);
U-21 national team: 5 (1989).

General player statistics
caps(goals)
Turkey Cup: 20(1)
Turkcell Süper Lig: 185(9)
Official Cups: 4(0)
Friendly Matches: 2(1)
World Cup elimination: 2(0)
Chancellor Cup: 1(0)
European Championship: 4(0)
Second League: 91(2)

Manager career
Serhat Güller has started his managing career in İnegölspor too. He managed Boluspor two seasons. Lastly he managed Mersin İdmanyurdu. Mersin İdmanyurdu was new in the Bank Asya 1. Lig, therefore he made extensive amount of transfers, to which many have followed in winter period. He managed the team for 20 games; and received 7 wins, 2 draws and 11 losses. He left the team when it was 13th place.

Team, season, task
Etimesgut Şekerspor (2002), trainer
Kızılcahamam Belediyespor (2002–2004), trainer, then manager
Kayserispor (2004–2005), trainer
İstanbul BŞB (2005–06), trainer
İnegölspor (2006–07), manager
Boluspor (2007–09), manager
Mersin İdmanyurdu (2009–10), manager
Denizlispor (2011), manager
Körfez FK (2011–present), manager

References

External links
Coach profile at TFF
Serhat Güller at Footballdatabase

1968 births
Living people
Turkish footballers
Turkish football managers
Turkey international footballers
Galatasaray S.K. footballers
Galatasaray S.K. (football) managers
Süper Lig players
Mersin İdman Yurdu managers
Turkey under-21 international footballers
Association football defenders
Mediterranean Games silver medalists for Turkey
Mediterranean Games medalists in football
Competitors at the 1991 Mediterranean Games